Jordan Dodds (born 29 October 1993) is an Australian figure skater. He is a two-time Australian national bronze medalist (2012, 2015). 

On the junior level, he is the 2011 Australian Junior National Champion. He also competed pairs skating from 2007-2015 with Eliza Smyth where he is a 3-time Australian Junior National Champion.

He reached the free skate at the 2020 and 2022 Four Continents Figure Skating Championships.

Personal life
Dodds was born on the Gold Coast in Queensland. He is the brother of pair skaters Matthew Dodds and Ryan Dodds and ice dancer Andrew Dodds. Jordan studies a Bachelor of Business majoring in Human Resources Management and is projected to graduate at the end of 2022.

Competitive highlights

References 

Australian male single skaters
Australian male pair skaters
1993 births
Living people
Competitors at the 2013 Winter Universiade